The seniors' division of the UAAP Season 75 volleyball tournaments opened December 1, 2012. Tournaments are hosted by National University. Tournament games are held at the Filoil Flying V Arena in San Juan, the Mall of Asia Arena in Pasay and the Smart Araneta Coliseum in Quezon City.

Men's tournament

Elimination round

Team standings

Schedule - Result

Results 
Results to the right and top of the gray cells are first round games, those to the left and below are second round games.

Bracket

Semifinals

NU vs. Adamson 
Elimination round games:
 December 19: NU (3–0) Adamson at the Filoil Flying V Arena (26–24, 25–22, 25–19)
 January 23: NU (1–3) Adamson at the Filoil Flying V Arena (25–22, 20–25, 22–25, 27–29)

FEU vs. La Salle 
Elimination round games:
 December 12: FEU (3–0) La Salle at the Filoil Flying V Arena (25–23, 25–17, 26–24)
 January 20: FEU (3–2) La Salle at the Filoil Flying V Arena (22–25, 25–19, 25–21, 26–28, 15–13)

Finals 
Elimination round games:
 December 8: NU (3–1) FEU at the Filoil Flying V Arena (19–25, 25–18, 26–24, 25–18)
 February 17: NU (1–3) FEU at the Filoil Flying V Arena (20–25, 14–25, 30–28, 20–25)

Awards 

 Finals Most Valuable Player: Peter Den Mar Torres (National University)
 Season Most Valuable Player: Mark Gil Alfafara (University of Santo Tomas) and Red Christensen (De La Salle University)
 Rookie of the Year: Nikko Ramirez (Adamson University)
 Best Scorer: Ron Jay Galang (Adamson University)
 Best Attacker: Peter Den Mar Torres (National University)
 Best Blocker: Mark Gil Alfafara (University of Santo Tomas)
 Best Server: Arvin Avila (Far Eastern University)
 Best Digger: Carlo Almario (University of the East)
 Best Setter: Vince Mangulabnan (National University)
 Best Receiver: Arvin Avila (Far Eastern University)

Women's tournament

Elimination round

Team standings

Match-up results

Results 
Results to the right and top of the gray cells are first round games, those to the left and below are second round games.

Bracket

Fourth–seed playoff 
UST and NU, which are tied at fourth place, played for the #4 seed, the last berth to the semifinal round of the playoffs.

Elimination round games:
 December 5: UST (1–3) NU at the Filoil Flying V Arena (16–25, 23–25, 25–23, 13–25)
 February 9: UST (3–1) NU at the SM Mall Of Asia Arena (25–21, 25–21, 23–25, 25–17)

Semifinals

La Salle vs. NU 
Elimination round games:
 December 19: La Salle (3–0) NU at the Filoil Flying V Arena (25–12, 25–17, 25–19)
 January 19: La Salle (3–2) NU at the Filoil Flying V Arena (25–20, 23–25, 24–26, 25–13, 15–8)

Ateneo vs. Adamson
Elimination round games:
 January 6: Ateneo (3–2) Adamson at the Filoil Flying V Arena (22–25, 25–23, 25–18, 23–25, 15–11)
 January 20: Ateneo (2–3) Adamson at the Filoil Flying V Arena (22–25, 21–25, 25–19, 25–16, 10–15)

Finals 
Elimination round games:
 January 12: La Salle (3–2) Ateneo at the Filoil Flying V Arena (26–28, 21–25, 25–13, 25–21, 15–13)
 February 9: La Salle (3–0) Ateneo at Mall of Asia Arena (25–19, 25–23, 25–21)

Awards 

 Finals Most Valuable Player: Michele Gumabao (De La Salle University)
 Season Most Valuable Players: Victonara Galang and Abigail Maraño (De La Salle University)
 Rookie of the Year: Aiko Urdas (National University)
 Best Scorer: Alyssa Valdez (Ateneo de Manila University)
 Best Setter: Jamenea Ferrer (Ateneo de Manila University)
 Best Attacker: Myla Pablo (National University) 
 Best Digger: Jennylyn Reyes (National University)
 Best Receiver: Jennylyn Reyes (National University)
 Best Blocker: Abigail Maraño (De La Salle University)
 Best Server: Shiela Marie Pineda (Adamson University)

Boys' tournament

Elimination round

Team standings

Host team in boldface.

Match-up results

Awards

 Most Valuable Player: Edward Camposano (University of the East)
 Rookie of the Year:
 Best Attacker: Edward Camposano (University of the East)
 Best Blocker: Edward Camposano (University of the East)
 Best Setter: Evander Monsanto (University of the East)
 Best Receiver: Lester Kim Sawal (University of the East)
 Best Libero: Manuel Sumanguid III (National University)

Girls' tournament

Elimination round

Team standings

 Host team in boldface.

Match-up results

Awards

 Most Valuable Player: Alessandra Isabel Narciso (De La Salle Zobel)
 Rookie of the Year: Ejiya Laure (University of Santo Tomas)
 Best Attacker: Alyja Daphne Santiago (National University)
 Best Blocker: Kim Kianna Dy (De La Salle Zobel)
 Best Setter: Alessandra Isabel Narciso (De La Salle Zobel)
 Best Receiver: Ennajie Laure (University of Santo Tomas)
 Best Libero: Dawn Nicole Macandili (De La Salle Zobel)

See also
 UAAP Season 75

References

2012 in Philippine sport
2013 in Philippine sport
2012 in volleyball
2013 in volleyball
UAAP Season 75
UAAP volleyball tournaments